Newham University Hospital is an acute general hospital situated in Plaistow in the London Borough of Newham. It is managed by Barts Health NHS Trust.

History
The hospital was built to replace Queen Mary's Hospital for the East End in Stratford and East Ham Memorial Hospital and was opened by the Queen as Newham General Hospital on 14 December 1983. A maternity department was added in 1985. The second phase of the hospital development, which introduced additional maternity beds, a special care baby unit, a rehabilitation department and an academic centre was opened by Diana, Princess of Wales on 18 February 1986. A women's centre and an ambulatory care centre were added in 2000. The hospital's name was changed to Newham University Hospital in 2004.

The Gateway Surgical Centre, which includes 39 beds, a renal unit and three operating theatres, opened in 2005. In 2012 the accident and emergency department was reconfigured to benefit from Pearson Lloyd's redesign, "A Better A&E", which reduced aggression against hospital staff by 50%.

Health tourism
A check on 1,497 maternity patients at the hospital in 2017 found that 17 were not entitled to free NHS treatment and billed them £104,706.

Patient entertainment 
Bedrock Radio (established circa 2002), provide a community health radio service for East London, South Essex and immediate surrounding areas. Bedrock Radio is a registered charity.

Transport
London Buses routes 104, 147, 262, 276, 300, 376 and 473 serve the hospital. The nearest train stations are Plaistow and Upton Park on the District and Hammersmith & City lines of the London Underground and Prince Regent on the Docklands Light Railway. Limited parking for automobiles is available in the hospital together with disabled spaces.

In popular culture
Rapper 21 Savage was born at the hospital on 22 October 1992

See also 
 Healthcare in London
 List of hospitals in England

References

External links 

 
 Newham University Hospital on the NHS website
 Inspection reports from the Care Quality Commission

Barts Health NHS Trust
Buildings and structures in the London Borough of Newham
Health in the London Borough of Newham
Hospitals established in 1983
Plaistow, Newham
West Ham